Legal science is one of the main components in civil law tradition (after Roman law, canon law, commercial law, and the legacy of the revolutionary period).

Legal science is primarily the creation of German legal scholars of the middle and late nineteenth century, and it evolved naturally out of the ideas of Friedrich Carl von Savigny.  Savigny argued that German codification should not follow the rationalist and secular natural law thinking that characterized the French codification but should be based on the principles of law that had historically been in force in Germany. It is referred to as "Rechtswissenschaften" (plural) or "Rechtswissenschaft" (singular) in German.

See also 
 Legal theory

References

Books 
 Black's Law Dictionary, Abridged Seventh Edition, Bryan A. Garner
 Sabino Cassese,  Recensione a J.H. Merryman, “The Italian Style, Doctrine, Law, Interpretation”, in “Stanford Law Review”, 1965–66, in “Rivista trimestrale di diritto pubblico”, 1966, n. 2, pp. 419–424.

External links 
 The "Science" of Legal Science: The Model of the Natural Sciences in Nineteenth-Century American Legal Education

Legal education
Philosophy of law